Isabella of Ibelin (1252–1282) was lady of Beirut from 1264 until her death in 1282, and also held the title of Queen of Cyprus. She was the daughter of John II of Beirut, lord of Beirut, and of Alice de la Roche sur Ognon.

Life
Isabella was a member of the influential Ibelin family. Upon her father's death, she inherited the Ibelin family palace in Beirut and the leadership of the fief. It was part of the Kingdom of Jerusalem but had an independent treaty from 1261 with Baibars, leader of the Muslim Mamluks.

In 1265, the young Isabella was betrothed to the young Hugh II, king of Cyprus (1252–1267), but he died before the marriage was consummated. She then ruled independently, and as Lady of Beirut had friendly relations with the Mamluks, negotiating her own new 10-year truce with Baibars on May 9, 1269. She had an affair with the impetuous Julian of Sidon (d. 1275), and her "notorious lack of chastity" (possibly) prompted the official letter Audi filia et from Pope Clement IV, urging her to marry. In 1272, at the age of 20, she married Haymo Létrange (the Foreigner), a wealthy lord from the Welsh Marches who may have been a companion of the future English king Edward I. The marriage was short though, as Haymo died in 1273. While on his deathbed, he put Isabella and Beirut under the unusual protection of Baibars, the Muslim sultan. King Hugh III of Cyprus wanted to use Isabella's status as a wealthy heiress to choose a new husband for her, to attract another distinguished knight to the fight in the Holy Land. Hugh forcibly took Isabella to Cyprus to arrange a new marriage, leaving her mother Alice de la Roche as regent of Beirut.  Isabella resisted and received the support of both Baibars and the Knights Templar. The matter was brought to the Jerusalem High Court and became a political dispute during the Crusades as to who had lordship over the lady of Beirut, the Crusader king or the Muslim sultan.  The High Court ruled in favor of Baibars, and Mamluk guards were assigned to Isabella's protection. After Baibars' death in 1277, Isabella married twice more, to Nicolas l'Alleman, lord of Caesarea, and then to William Barlais (d. 1304).

Isabella never had any children, and upon her death in 1282 at the age of 30, the lordship of Beirut passed to her younger sister Eschiva (1253–1312).

References

Further reading
 Lignages d'Outremer, Le Vaticanus Latinus 4789, CCC.XXXIII, pp. 90, 98, 104
 Rüdt-Collenberg, W. H. (1979) 'Les Ibelins aux XIIIe et XIVe siècles, Généalogie compilée principalement selon les registres du Vatican', Epeteris tou Kentrou Epistemonikon Ereunon IX, 1977-1979 (Nicosia), reprinted in Familles de l'Orient  XIIe-XIVe siècles (Variorum Reprints, London, 1983)
 Rüdt-Collenberg, W. H. ´Les dispenses matrimoniales accordées à l´Orient Latin selon les Registres du Vatican 1283-1385´, Mélanges de l'École française de Rome: Moyen Âge, Tome 89, no. 1, (1977)
 Ibn el-Furat in Reinaud, Chron. arabes, p. 532. Cp. Muhyi e-Din in Michaud, Bibliogr. des Croisades'', II (1822), p. 685.

External links
 

Cypriot queens consort
Remarried royal consorts
1252 births
1282 deaths
13th century in Cyprus
History of Beirut
People from Beirut
13th-century women rulers